Plum Creek is a ghost town in Kossuth County, in the U.S. state of Iowa. A railroad station was once located at Plum Creek.

History
Plum Creek contained a post office from 1902 until 1904. The hamlet took its name from nearby Plum Creek.

From 1899 to 1916 it was Home to the Plum Creek Co-op Creamery.

References

Geography of Kossuth County, Iowa
Ghost towns in Iowa
1902 establishments in Iowa
Populated places established in 1902